Robert Dudley alias Sutton (1471/1472 – 1539), was an English politician.

He was a Member (MP) of the Parliament of England for Shrewsbury in 1529 and 1536.

References

1470s births
1539 deaths
English MPs 1529–1536
English MPs 1536